Lutero Sarmanho Vargas (24 February 1912 – 4 October 1989) was a Brazilian physician, diplomat, and politician. He was the oldest son of former President of Brazil Getúlio Vargas.

References 

1912 births
1989 deaths
People from São Borja
Brazilian people of Portuguese descent
Brazilian diplomats
Brazilian Labour Party (current) politicians
Brazilian Labour Party (historical) politicians
Members of the Chamber of Deputies (Brazil) from the Federal District
Lutero Vargas
Children of presidents of Brazil